Rasbora rubrodorsalis is a species of cyprinid fish native to southeast Asia where it occurs in the basins of the Mekong, Chao Phraya and Mae Klong rivers.  It prefers areas of slow-flowing streams and ponds and ditches.  This species can reach a length of  SL.

References 

Rasboras
Fish of the Mekong Basin
Fish of Cambodia
Fish of Laos
Fish of Thailand
Fish of Vietnam
Fish described in 1997